Elspeth Rosamund Morton Howe, Baroness Howe of Idlicote,  ( Shand; 8 February 1932 – 22 March 2022) was a British life peer and crossbench member of the House of Lords (2001–2020) who served in many capacities in public life. As the widow of Geoffrey Howe, she was formerly known as Lady Howe of Aberavon before receiving a peerage in her own right. She was the paternal half-aunt of Queen Camilla.

Personal life
Howe was the daughter of the writer Philip Morton Shand by his fourth wife, Sybil Mary Shand (née Sissons; formerly Slee). As such, she was a half-aunt to Queen Camilla of the United Kingdom (née Shand, formerly Parker Bowles), whose father, Bruce Shand, was son of P. Morton Shand by a previous marriage. Elspeth Shand grew up in Bath, Somerset, and was educated at Wycombe Abbey, a leading private school for girls, and at the London School of Economics. She married the rising politician Geoffrey Howe in 1953, and had three children, Caroline (Cary), and twins, Amanda and Alec.

Career
Howe served as deputy chairman of the Equal Opportunities Commission from 1975 to 1979, and in various other capacities from 1980. She was later made chair of the Broadcasting Standards Commission. In the 1999 New Year Honours she was appointed a Commander of the Order of the British Empire (CBE). Lady Howe was a Justice of the Peace in Inner London from 1964 until her retirement from the Bench in 2002. She sat in the Youth Court at Camberwell where she was a bench chairman.

On 29 June 2001, at the age of 69, she was made a life peer, as Baroness Howe of Idlicote, of Shipston-on-Stour in the County of Warwickshire, in her own right, becoming one of the first People's Peers. She and her husband were one of the few couples each of whom held a peerage in their own right. Having already been styled Lady Howe by dint of her husband's knighthood and then his peerage, it was quipped when she received her own peerage that she was "once, twice, three times a Lady".

Howe retired from Parliament on 2 June 2020. She died at her home in Idlicote, Warwickshire, on 22 March 2022, aged 90, following a battle with cancer.

References

Further reading

External links

Media: A Tory feminist for TV's watchdog: Michael Leapman profiles Lady Elspeth Howe, the incoming chair of the Broadcasting Standards Council

1932 births
2022 deaths
Elspeth
Howe of Idlicote, Elspeth Howe, Baroness
Crossbench life peers
Commanders of the Order of the British Empire
People educated at Wycombe Abbey
Honorary Fellows of the London School of Economics
Spouses of life peers
Deaths from cancer in England
Place of birth missing
Life peeresses created by Elizabeth II
Wives of knights